Chah Tus (also Romanized as Chāh Ţūs and Chah Toos; also known as Chād Ţūs, Chātūs, and Shatū) is a village in Mahmeleh Rural District, Mahmeleh District, Khonj County, Fars Province, Iran. In 2006, its population was 795, in 164 families.

References 

Populated places in Khonj County